Francis D. Sullivan is a former member of the Ohio Senate. He served the 24th District, which was based out of Cuyahoga County. He served from 1967 to 1968.

References

Democratic Party Ohio state senators
Living people
Year of birth missing (living people)